The 1922-23 Philadelphia F.C. season was the first season for a new Philadelphia club in the American Soccer League after the Bethlehem Steel F.C. was transferred "back" to Bethlehem after playing the prior season as Philadelphia F.C. The new Philadelphia team was made up entirely of local players; the team struggled in the league, finishing the season last in 8th place.

American Soccer League

Pld = Matches played; W = Matches won; D = Matches drawn; L = Matches lost; GF = Goals for; GA = Goals against; Pts = Points

Notes and references
Bibliography

Footnotes

Philadelphia F.C.
American Soccer League (1921–1933) seasons
Philadelphia F.C.